Aviation Vacation is a 1941 Warner Bros. Merrie Melodies theatrical short directed by Tex Avery, with story by Dave Monahan and musical direction by Carl Stalling. The cartoon was released on August 2, 1941.

Synopsis

This is one of the cartoons that Warner would occasionally produce that featured none of its stable of characters, just a series of gags, usually based on outrageous stereotypes and plays on words, as a narrator (voiced by Robert C. Bruce) describes the action. In this case, the story concerns a small airplane taking its passengers on a world tour. Some excerpts:

The plane, as well as its shadow, are remarkably flexible. The plane takes off like a bird, running and jumping and flapping its wings. The plane's shadow, seen from above, dodges ground-level obstacles.
The plane passes Mount Rushmore, which is seen to also include the two major candidates from the 1940 election, Franklin D. Roosevelt ("For Democrats") and Wendell Willkie ("For Republicans").
In Ireland, an Irish tenor (in rotoscoping) sings "When Irish Eyes Are Smiling", while a (cartooned) stray hair keeps appearing in the frame, as if stuck in the projector. The Irishman abruptly stops singing and yells at the top of his lungs to the projectionist, "Hey, you, up there! Get that hair out of here!" This joke was later reused in Avery's cartoon Magical Maestro (1952). 
At the darkest interior of "Darkest Africa", natives are listening to jungle drumbeats which are used for communication. One native asks another what the drums are saying, and the second native (illustrating the age of this kind of joke), responds, "Boop-ditty, boop-ditty, boop-boop-de-boop!"
Also in Africa, a native is using a blowgun, and is revealed that he was merely aiming at a practice target. His target calls him a "terrible shot". 
A group of ostriches hide their heads in the sand. Another ostrich arrives, perplexed, wondering where everyone went.
A series of cocoons opens up, all of them producing beautiful butterflies, except for a weak and scrawny one: "Well, I've been sick!"
The cartoon ends with the plane lost in fog while returning to New York City. When the fog finally clears, the plane is discovered to be attached to a carousel ride, and as it circles, "The Merry-Go-Round Broke Down" is playing. In this unique instance for a WB cartoon, the Looney Tunes theme segues into the Merrie Melodies theme at the fade-out.

Notes
When MeTV aired the cartoon on March 17, 2021, the WARNER BROS text in the opening rings is missing.

When MeTV aired the cartoon on June 3, 2022, the scenes with African natives were not shown.

A watermark free version of When Irish Eyes Are Smiling showed up on YouTube on March 17, 2022.

See also
 Looney Tunes and Merrie Melodies filmography (1940–1949)

References

External links

 Aviation Vacation on the Internet Archive

Merrie Melodies short films
Warner Bros. Cartoons animated short films
1941 animated films
1941 films
1940s English-language films
American aviation films
Films directed by Tex Avery
1941 comedy films
1940s animated short films
Films scored by Carl Stalling
1940s Warner Bros. animated short films